Kidder may refer to:

Places
In the United States:
 Kidder, Kentucky
 Kidder, Missouri
 Kidder, South Dakota
 Kidder Township, Pennsylvania
 Kidder Mountain, a summit in New Hampshire

Other uses
 Kidder (surname)
 USS Kidder (DD-319), United States Navy destroyer